Sir John Cole, 1st Baronet (died 1691) was an Anglo-Irish politician. He was the second son of Sir William Cole (died 1653), a key figure in the Plantation of Ulster, and his second wife Catherine Parsons, daughter of Sir Lawrence Parsons of Birr Castle, Baron of the Court of Exchequer (Ireland) and Anne Malham. William was a Londoner, the only son of Emmanuel Cole, from a family which originated in Devon. Sir Arthur Ingram, the investor, landowner and politician was a cousin through William's mother, Margaret Ingram. John's elder brother Michael was the ancestor of the Earl of Enniskillen.

Cole was a Royalist who, as Governor of Enniskillen, had been a prominent promoter of the interests of Charles II of England. On 23 January 1661, he was made a baronet of Newland in the Baronetage of Ireland in recognition of his loyalty to the Crown. Cole sat in the Irish House of Commons as the Member of Parliament for Fermanagh between 1661 and 1666, and from 1661 to his death he was Custos Rotulorum of Fermanagh. Cole was one of the commissioners appointed to implement the Act of Settlement 1662 in Ireland. In 1675 he was made a member of the Privy Council of Ireland.

He married Elizabeth Chichester, daughter of Lieutenant-Colonel John Chichester and the Honourable Mary Jones, daughter of Roger Jones, 1st Viscount Ranelagh, and aunt of Richard Jones, 1st Earl of Ranelagh, by whom he had eleven children. Cole was succeeded in his title by his eldest son, Arthur Cole, who was made Baron Ranelagh in 1715. Arthur had no issue and both titles died with him. Cole's daughter Elizabeth married her cousin Sir Michael Cole. Another daughter, Mary, married Henry Hamilton-Moore, 3rd Earl of Drogheda, and a third, Frances, married Sir Thomas Domville,1st Baronet.

References

Year of birth unknown
1691 deaths
17th-century Anglo-Irish people
Cavaliers
Cole family (Anglo-Irish aristocracy)
Irish MPs 1661–1666
Baronets in the Baronetage of Ireland
Members of the Parliament of Ireland (pre-1801) for County Fermanagh constituencies
Members of the Privy Council of Ireland